Josh Teater (born April 6, 1979) is an American professional golfer who has played on the PGA Tour.

Teater was born in Danville, Kentucky. He attended the Morehead State University, where he had one collegiate title. He turned professional in 2001.

Teater bounced around on the mini-tours from 2001 to 2009 until he joined the Nationwide Tour.

Teater found success in his Nationwide Tour rookie season. He finished runner-up to Michael Sim at the Christmas in October Classic and won the Utah Championship in September. He finished 7th on the money list to earn his 2010 PGA Tour card and finished 89th in 2010 to retain his PGA Tour card.

Professional wins (1)

Nationwide Tour wins (1)

Results in major championships

CUT = missed the half-way cut
"T" = tied

See also
2009 Nationwide Tour graduates
2018 Web.com Tour Finals graduates

References

External links

American male golfers
PGA Tour golfers
Korn Ferry Tour graduates
Golfers from Kentucky
Morehead State Eagles athletes
People from Danville, Kentucky
Sportspeople from Lexington, Kentucky
1979 births
Living people